The Pan American Junior Chess Championship is an annual chess tournament open to players in the Americas who are under 20 years of age. The tournament has been held since 1974 with occasional interruptions. Beginning in 1995, a separate championship for girls has been held concurrently with the open championship. 

The reigning champion is Annie Wang, who was the first girl to win any of the gender-unrestricted continental under-20 championships.

Competition
The championships are organized by national federations affiliated with the Confederation of Chess for America (CCA). They are open to chess players who are under 20 years of age as of 1 January of the year in which the championship is held. The tournament format has varied over the years depending on the number of participants; since 2004, the open championship has been a nine-round Swiss-system tournament.

The winners of the open and girls' championships earn the right to participate in the next year's World Junior Chess Championships. In the open championship, the top three players after tiebreaks all earn the International Master title, while the first-placed player additionally earns a norm towards the Grandmaster title. In the girls' championship, the top three players after tiebreaks all earn the Woman International Master title, while the first-placed player additionally earns a norm towards the Woman Grandmaster title.

Results

Open championship

Girls' championship

See also
African Junior Chess Championship
Asian Junior Chess Championship
European Junior Chess Championship
European Youth Chess Championship
North American Youth Chess Championship

References

Supranational chess championships
1974 in chess
Recurring sporting events established in 1974
Women's chess competitions
1995 in chess
Recurring sporting events established in 1995
Chess in North America
Chess in South America
International sports championships in the Americas
Under-20 sports competitions